Andrew Brocklehurst (born 6 March 1983) is a  rugby league player.

Brocklehurst joined Salford City Reds in 2004 from London Broncos. He has also played for Halifax and is a coach at his former amateur side.

In September 2008, it was announced that Brocklehurst had joined Barrow Raiders. On 30 June 2009, it was announced that his contract with Barrow Raiders had been terminated "following a serious breach of club discipline amounting to gross misconduct".

References

1983 births
Living people
Barrow Raiders players
English rugby league coaches
English rugby league players
Halifax R.L.F.C. players
London Broncos players
Rugby articles needing expert attention
Salford Red Devils players